The River Feshie is a major right bank tributary of the River Spey in north-east Scotland. It rises in the remote countryside of the Glenfeshie Forest, flowing initially eastwards before turning sharply to the northwest as a result of the capture of the waters of Geldie Burn. After gaining the waters of the River Eidart on its right bank and dropping down into Glen Feshie, it flows northwards through the wooded glen and is often braided in nature. It is joined by several burns which descend steeply from the Cairngorm plateau to the east and, on its left bank, by the Allt Chomhraig near Balachroick. The river passes beneath the B970 road at Feshiebridge and after a further 1.5 miles (2.5 km) it joins the Spey near the village of Kincraig.

Etymology 
The name of the river and the glen which it occupies derives from the Gaelic faith meaning 'boggy place' and isidh signifying 'pasture land'.

References

External links

Feshie
1Feshie